Pistiko is a village of the Grevena municipality. Before the 2011 local government reform it was a part of the municipality of Ventzio. The 2011 census recorded 50 residents in the village. Pistiko is a part of the community of Knidi. According to the statistics of Vasil Kanchov ("Macedonia, Ethnography and Statistics"), 255 Vallahades (Grecophone Muslims) lived in the village in 1900.

See also
 List of settlements in the Grevena regional unit

References

Populated places in Grevena (regional unit)